The Hillsdale Public Schools is a community public school district that serves students in pre-kindergarten through eighth grade in Hillsdale, in Bergen County, New Jersey, United States.

As of the 2018–19 school year, the district, comprising three schools, had an enrollment of 1,147 students and 117.0 classroom teachers (on an FTE basis), for a student–teacher ratio of 9.8:1.

The district is classified by the New Jersey Department of Education as being in District Factor Group "GH", the third-highest of eight groupings. District Factor Groups organize districts statewide to allow comparison by common socioeconomic characteristics of the local districts. From lowest socioeconomic status to highest, the categories are A, B, CD, DE, FG, GH, I and J.

Public school students in ninth through twelfth grades attend Pascack Valley High School along with students from neighboring River Vale. The school is part of the Pascack Valley Regional High School District, which also serves students from Montvale and Woodcliff Lake at Pascack Hills High School. During the 1994-96 school years, Northern Valley Regional High School at Demarest was awarded the Blue Ribbon School Award of Excellence by the United States Department of Education. As of the 2018–19 school year, the high school had an enrollment of 1,209 students and 92.6 classroom teachers (on an FTE basis), for a student–teacher ratio of 13.1:1.

Schools 
Schools in the district (with 2018–19 enrollment data from the National Center for Education Statistics) are:
Elementary schools
Ann Blanche Smith School with 317 students in Kindergarten through 4th grade
Angela Iskenderian, Principal
Meadowbrook Elementary School with 291 students in grades Pre-K-4
Christopher R. Bell, Principal
Middle school
George G. White Middle School with 531 students in grades 5-8
Donald Bergamini, Principal

Administration 
Core members of the district's administration are:
Dr. Robert V. Lombardy Jr., Superintendent of Schools
Sacha Pouliot, Business Administrator / Board Secretary

Board of education
The district's board of education, with five members, sets policy and oversees the fiscal and educational operation of the district through its administration. As a Type II school district, the board's trustees are elected directly by voters to serve three-year terms of office on a staggered basis, with one to two seats up for election each year held (since 2012) as part of the November general election. The board appoints a superintendent to oversee the day-to-day operation of the district.

References

External links 

School Data for the Hillsdale Public Schools, National Center for Education Statisticsa district of schools
Pascack Valley High School

Hillsdale, New Jersey
New Jersey District Factor Group GH
School districts in Bergen County, New Jersey